The 2021–22 Preston North End F.C. season is the club's 142nd season in existence and their seventh consecutive season in the Championship. They will also take part in the FA Cup and the EFL Cup. The season covers the period from July 2021 to 30 June 2022.

Squad

 All appearances and goals up to date as of 7 May 2022.

Statistics

Players with names in italics and marked * were on loan from another club for the whole of their season with Preston North End.

|-
!colspan=14|Players out on loan:

|-
!colspan=14|Players who left the club:

|}

Goals record

Disciplinary record

Contracts

Transfers

Transfers in

Loans in

Loans out

Transfers out

Pre-season friendlies
Preston North End announced they would play friendlies against Bamber Bridge, St Johnstone, Celtic, Bolton Wanderers, Accrington Stanley, Manchester City, Wigan Athletic and Manchester United as part of their pre-season preparations.

Competitions

Overview

EFL Championship

League table

Results summary

Results by matchday

Matches
PNE's fixtures were announced on 24 June 2021.

FA Cup

PNE were drawn away to Cardiff City in the third round.

EFL Cup

Preston North End were drawn away to Mansfield Town and Morecambe in the first and second round respectively, then at home against Cheltenham Town and Liverpool in the third and fourth round.

Lancashire Senior Cup

Preston North End were drawn away to Rochdale in the first round.

Notes

References

External links

Preston North End F.C. seasons
Preston North End F.C.